Dempsey James Barron (March 5, 1922 – July 7, 2001) was an American politician. He served as President of the Florida Senate from 1975–1976. He also was a long-standing Chairman of the Senate Rules Committee. He died of complications from Alzheimer's disease, Parkinson's disease and heart problems on July 7, 2001.

Education
Barron attended Florida State University and also the University of Florida College of Law.

References

1922 births
2001 deaths
Florida State University alumni
Fredric G. Levin College of Law alumni
Presidents of the Florida Senate
Democratic Party Florida state senators
People from Andalusia, Alabama
20th-century American politicians